Antocha saxicola is a species of limoniid crane fly in the family Limoniidae, tribe Limoniini. Larvae lack open spiracles and can only live in fast-flowing, well-oxygenated water.

References

External links

Limoniidae
Articles created by Qbugbot